Hasibun Naher is a Bangladeshi applied mathematics researcher and educator. In February 2018, she was one of five young women from developing countries to receive the OWSD-Elsevier Foundation Award. Her research has included the application of mathematics to tsunamis in order to improve predictions of how they develop. She is currently Associate Professor of Mathematics at BRAC University, Dhaka.

References

Living people
People from Dhaka
Bangladeshi mathematicians
Bangladeshi women scientists
Women mathematicians
Year of birth missing (living people)